Grigory Isaakovich Broydo (7 November 1883 – 23 May 1956) was a Soviet politician who served as the First Secretary of the Communist Party of Tajikistan from 23 December 1933 to 3 January 1935.

References

Politicians from Vilnius
People from Vilensky Uyezd
Central Committee of the Communist Party of the Soviet Union candidate members
Lithuanian communists
Saint Petersburg State University alumni
Jewish Lithuanian politicians
Jews from the Russian Empire
Lithuanian Jews
Soviet Jews
1883 births
1956 deaths
First Secretaries of the Communist Party of Tajikistan